This is a list of star systems within 70-75 light years of Earth.

See also
Lists of stars
List of star systems within 65-70 light-years
List of star systems within 75-80 light-years
List of nearest stars and brown dwarfs

References

star systems within 70–75 light-years
Star systems
star systems within 70–75 light-years